The 1943 National Invitation Tournament was the 1943 edition of the annual NCAA college basketball competition.

Selected teams
Below is a list of the eight teams selected for the tournament.

 Creighton
 Fordham
 Manhattan
 Rice
 St. John's
 Toledo
 Washington & Jefferson
 Western Kentucky

Bracket
Below is the tournament bracket.

See also
 1943 NCAA basketball tournament
 1943 NAIA Basketball Tournament

References

National Invitation
National Invitation Tournament
1940s in Manhattan
Basketball in New York City
College sports in New York City
Madison Square Garden
National Invitation Tournament
National Invitation Tournament
Sports competitions in New York City
Sports in Manhattan